General George Duncan Gordon, 5th Duke of Gordon,  (2 February 1770 – 28 May 1836), styled Marquess of Huntly until 1827, was a British nobleman, soldier and politician and the last of his line.

Early life
George was born at Edinburgh on 2 February 1770, the eldest son of Alexander Gordon, 4th Duke of Gordon and his wife, the celebrated Jane Gordon, Duchess of Gordon, née Lady Jane Maxwell. He was educated at Eton. He became a professional soldier and rose to the rank of general. As Marquess of Huntly, he served with the guards in Flanders from 1793 to 1794. 

From May 1796 as Colonel in Chief, he commanded the newly created regiment: the 92nd Highlanders (usually called the "Gordon Highlanders" in honour of his family). In 1798 he served with the regiment in Ireland as Brigadier General and went with them to Holland in 1799 On 2 October 1799 he was wounded at the battle at Egmont-op-Zee in Holland. In 1806 he left the 92nd and transferred to be Colonel in Chief of the 42nd Regiment of Foot ("Black Watch"). From 1820 he was commander of the 1st (Royal Foot).

He commanded a division in the Walcheren Expedition of 1809.

He was a freemason and was Grand Master of the Grand Lodge of Scotland from 1792 to 1794. He was a member of Parliament for Eye from 1806 to 1807. On 11 April 1807, at the age of 37, he was summoned to the House of Lords in one of the minor peerages of his father (Baron Gordon of Huntley, co. Gloucester). He was appointed a Privy Counsellor in 1830, was Keeper of the Great Seal of Scotland from 1828 to 1830 (a post that his father had held until 1827), and from 1834 to 1836 was Governor of Edinburgh Castle.

He left the 1st in 1834 and transferred to the Scots Fusilier Guards. He died on 28 May 1836.

Marriage

He married at Bath, on 11 December 1813, Elizabeth Brodie, who was twenty-four years his junior. Brodie was the daughter of Alexander Brodie of Arnhall in Kincardineshire. Elizabeth Grant described her thus:

However, at the time of his marriage and, in fact, until he inherited the Dukedom, George found himself in almost constant financial difficulties. He was referred to as "Lord Huntly now in the decline of his rackety life, overwhelmed with debts, sated with pleasure, tired of fashion, the last heir male of the Gordon line". While his marriage remedied some of these problems, it did not supply the much sought-after heir.

Like his father, George acquired many of the positions which the Gordon family could expect almost as of right. These included the posts of Lord Lieutenant of Aberdeenshire, Chancellor of Marischal College, Aberdeen, and Lord High Constable of Scotland. He held the latter post of Lord High Constable for the coronation of King George IV in 1820.

By the time of his succession to the dukedom, he had established a reputation as an extreme reactionary. He steadfastly opposed the Great Reform Bill and when the majority of Tory Peers opted to abstain, he remained one of the twenty-two "Stalwarts" who voted against the Third Reading of the Bill in the House of Lords on 4 June 1832.

Throughout much of this period, his wife served Queen Adelaide at court. Indeed, she was given the Queen's coronation robe, which is now to be found with many other Gordon memorabilia at Brodie Castle.

Nathaniel Parker Willis, the American journalist, has left us with an interesting account of life at Gordon Castle in the twilight years of the 5th Duke's life. He described the "canonically fat porter" at the lodges who admitted him to a "rich private world peopled by ladies cantering sidesaddle on palfreys, ladies driving nowhere in particular in phaetons, gentlemen with guns, keepers with hounds and terrier at the heel, and everywhere a profusion of fallow deer, hares, and pheasants. At the castle a dozen lounging and powdered menials." Willis continued: "I never realised so forcibly the splendid results of wealth and primogeniture." Just before dinner, the Duke called at his room, "an affable white-haired gentleman of noble physiognomy, but singularly cordial address, wearing a broad red ribbon across his breast, and led him through files of servants to a dining room ablaze with gold plate."

Legacy

The Duke died at Belgrave Square, London, on 28 May 1836, aged 66. The Dukedom of Gordon became extinct, but the Marquessate of Huntly (created in 1599) passed to his distant cousin the Earl of Aboyne while the Gordon estates passed to his nephew, Charles Gordon-Lennox, 5th Duke of Richmond. The Gordon moveable property was left by the Duchess to the Brodies of Brodie.

Elizabeth Brodie, the last Duchess of Gordon, retired to Huntly Castle Lodge, where she became more fervently religious than she had previously been until her death on 31 January 1864, when the last trace of the original Dukedom of Gordon was also extinguished.

The Duke and Duchess of Gordon established the Gordon Chapel (Scottish Episcopal Church) in Fochabers that contains a memorial tablet to the 5th and last Duke.

The Duke had three illegitimate children: Charles Gordon, Susan Sordet, and Georgiana McCrae.

References

External links 

 
George Gordon, 5th Duke of Gordon

|-

|-

1770 births
1836 deaths
Alumni of St John's College, Cambridge
Black Watch officers
British Army generals
British Army personnel of the French Revolutionary Wars
British Army personnel of the Napoleonic Wars
5
Earls of Norwich
Gordon Highlanders officers
Keepers of the Great Seal of Scotland
Knights Grand Cross of the Order of the Bath
Lord-Lieutenants of Aberdeenshire
Huntly, George Gordon, Marquess of
Members of the Privy Council of the United Kingdom
People educated at Eton College
Scots Guards officers
Huntly, George Gordon, Marquess of
UK MPs who inherited peerages
13